The rates of adverse effects of aripiprazole are:

Adults

Very common (>10% incidence)

 Weight gain
 Headache
 Agitation
 Insomnia
 Anxiety
 Nausea & vomiting
 Akathisia — a sense of unease and restlessness that presents itself with anxiety
 Lightheadedness
 Constipation
 Emotional instability
 Euphoria or Dysphoria

Common (1-10% incidence)

 Dizziness
 Dyspepsia — indigestion
 Somnolence — which is usually mild and transient and less severe than that seen with most antipsychotics.
 Fatigue
 Restlessness
 Dry mouth
 Extrapyramidal side effects (e.g. dystonia, parkinsonism, tremor, myoclonic jerks, etc.)
 Orthostatic hypotension
 Musculoskeletal stiffness
 Abdominal discomfort
 Blurred vision
 Cough
 Pain
 Myalgia
 Rash 
 Rhinitis

Uncommon (0.1-1% incidence)

 Leukopenia
 Thrombocytopenia
 Bradycardia (low heart rate)
 Palpitations
 Orthostatic hypotension
 Dry eye
 Photophobia
 Diplopia
 Eyelid oedema
 Photopsia
 Diarrhoea
 Gastritis
 Pathological gambling
 Dysphagia
 Gastroesophageal reflux disease
 Swollen tongue
 Oesophagitis
 Hypoaesthesia oral
 Face oedema
 Gait disturbance
 Chills
 Discomfort
 Feeling abnormal
 Mobility decreased
 Self-mutilation
 Heart rate increased
 Blood glucose increased
 Pyrexia
 Blood prolactin increased
 Blood urea increased
 Electrocardiogram QT prolonged
 Blood bilirubin increased
 Hepatic enzyme increased
 Increased appetite
 Nocturia
 Polyuria
 Pollakiuria
 Incontinence
 Urinary retention
 Sexual dysfunction
 Amenorrhoea
 Pruritus
 Photosensitivity reaction
 Urticaria

Rare (<0.1%)

 Neuroleptic malignant syndrome (Combination of fever, muscle stiffness, faster breathing, sweating, reduced consciousness, and sudden change in blood pressure and heart rate)
 Neutropenia
 Suicidal ideation and behavior
 Depression
 Painful and/or sustained erection (Priapism)
 Seizures
 Rhabdomyolysis
 Agranulocytosis
 Cardiopulmonary failure
 Myocardial infarction (heart attack)
 Atrial flutter
 Supraventricular tachycardia
 Ventricular tachycardia
 Atrioventricular block
 Extrasystoles
 Sinus tachycardia
 Atrial fibrillation
 Angina pectoris
 Myocardial ischaemia
 Pancreatitis
 Diabetic ketoacidosis
 Prolonged QT interval (less common than with most other atypical antipsychotic drugs)
 Speech disorder
 Electrolyte abnormalities including hyponatraemia, hypokalaemia, hypocalcaemia, etc.
 Hypertension
 Dysphagia
 Oropharyngeal spasm
 Laryngospasm
 Hepatitis
 Jaundice
 Hypersalivation
 Chest pain
 Urinary retention or incontinence
 Alopecia (hair loss)
 Photosensitivity reaction
 Rash
 Xerostomia (when given by injection)
 Tardive dyskinesia (As with all antipsychotic medication, patients using aripiprazole may develop the permanent neurological disorder tardive dyskinesia.)
 Stroke
 Transient Ischaemic Attack
 Increased body temperature
 Angioedema
 Cardiorespiratory arrest
 Cardiorespiratory failure

Sudden unexplained death has been reported, however the frequency is unknown.

Common in children
 Feeling sleepy
 Headache
 Vomiting
 Fatigue
 Increased appetite
 Insomnia
 Nausea
 Stuffy nose
 Weight gain
 Uncontrolled movement such as restlessness, tremor muscle stiffness

References

Aripiprazole